The Writers Guild Award for Best Written Musical was an award presented from 1949 to 1969 by the Writers Guild of America, after which it was discontinued.

Winners & Nominees

Notes
The year indicates when the film was released. The awards were presented the following year.

1940s

1950s

1960s

References

External links 

 WGA.org

Writers Guild of America Awards
Awards established in 1949